Ailigandí or Agligandi is a town and island in the Kuna Yala province of Panama. The island is just off the coast and is served by Ailigandí Airport. The town is also called Manglar or Mangrove Swamp.

Sources 

 Aerial view

Populated places in Guna Yala